Holywells Park is a  public park in Ipswich, England situated between Nacton Road and Cliff Lane, near to the Ipswich Waterfront.

History
Tools from the stone age have been found on the site, as well as bronze age axes and Roman coins.

In the 13th century Holywells was part of the Manor at Bishops Wyke which was held by the Bishops of Norwich. During the reign of Henry VIII. the Manor was returned to the crown and then granted to Sir John Jermy.

The land was bought by John Cobbold in 1812 who brought his wife Elizabeth Cobbold and their large family here to live in 1814. Cobbold later began using the areas natural springs to produce beer. In 1814 Holywells House was completed on the site of an old farmhouse (this building was demolished in 1962 due to wood rot and only the stable block remains). In 1935 the land at Holywells was presented to the people of Ipswich by Lord Woodbridge and then opened to the public in 1936. Holywells park is now a designated a Conservation Area and is on the English Heritage register of historic parks and gardens of special historic interest

In July 2012, Ipswich Borough Council received a grant of £2.8 million from the Heritage Lottery Fund (HLF) and Big Lottery Fund (BIG) for the Holywells "Parks for People" restoration project. The HLF grant was supplemented by funding from the Friends of Holywells Park and by the Borough Council. The grant was used to improve a range of park facilities and to enable the renovation of the Stable Block, converting it into a vibrant visitor centre and café with an education area and function room. The conservatory was refurbished and turned into a multi-function area that can be used for exhibitions, talks, meetings and other functions. The Stable Block and conservatory are both listed buildings

Activities
Established in 2001 the Friends of Holywells Park are a very active volunteer group whose aim is to increase the local knowledge, understanding and enjoyment of Holywells Park.
The park hosts numerous events throughout the year organised by Friends of Holywells Park, Suffolk Wildlife Trust, Ipswich Borough Council and charitable and private organisations.
Popular among the regular events are Family Fun Days (July-August), Practical conservation activities, a bat walk (August), a Cold Fair (January), Holi Festival of Colour (April), The Nearly Music Festival (and other concerts like 'Chopin in the Park'), Tea Dances and many more.

The park is frequently used for charity rides, runs and walks.

Sport and leisure
In summer 2007 work was completed on a new play area, situated on the site of the old play area. Work was also carried out to remove the paddling pool and in turn making a new stream joining the 3rd pond to the lake at the Holywells road end of the park. The play area for children, incorporates a hi-tech teen play facility, Water play facility (summer only) kiosk, toilets and changing room.

There is a trim trail that provides  fitness for all levels of physical ability. From simple Balance Beams to the challenge of Pole Climb or Ladder Walk, it tests upper and lower body strength, co-ordination, agility and overall stamina. The many paths in the park are well trodden by joggers and fitness walkers.

The park is home to Holywells Bowling Club. It also has a Victorian conservatory and a walled garden.

There are four entrances to the park: Cliff Lane, Myrtle Road, Bishop’s Hill and Nacton Road. Blue Badge parking is available at the Cliff Lane entrance and public parking at Athena Hall off Duke Street, IP3 0DT

Water supply
Holywells has played an important role in providing a water supply to Ipswich.

Wildlife and ornithology
The park has a variety of different habitats including formal gardens, ponds, fields and woodland, and these support a surprising large number of different species. There are protected bat species like pipistrelle and barbastelle and there is plenty of fallen and standing deadwood which provides homes for stag beetle, five banded weevil-wasp, bee wolf and golden hoverfly. The many ponds attract insects and in turn birds – kingfisher are regularly spotted as are woodpeckers. 
The Suffolk Wildlife Trust runs free wildlife sessions for schools and the park has an active team of park rangers which encourage young people with a love for nature, to build their practical conservation skills by learning from and working alongside local wildlife experts.

Holywells Park Conservation Area
In 2003 the Park gained Conservation Area status, along with the neighbouring Margaret Catchpole Public House. Pond 5 is known as Alder Carr and is a biodiversity action plan habitat.

References

Further reading
 Clive Hodges. 2016. 'Holywells, Home of the Cobbolds'. Ivybridge: [The Cobbold Family History Trust].
 Wessex Archeology restoration project

Parks and open spaces in Ipswich
Grade II listed buildings in Ipswich